Harold Kraft Memorial Field is a baseball venue in Grand Forks, North Dakota, United States.  It was home to the North Dakota Fighting Hawks baseball team of the NCAA Division I Western Athletic Conference.  It is named for Harold Kraft, former coach of the North Dakota baseball program who revived the program in 1956 after it had been discontinued in 1921.  Kraft coached the program from 1956 to 1981.  It has a capacity of 2,000 spectators. On April 12, 2016, the University of North Dakota announced it will be dropping its baseball program after the 2016 season due to budget cuts.

Features 
A FieldTurf surface was installed in 2011, allowing for play in a wider range of weather conditions.  The venue also features dugouts, bullpens, batting cages, and evergreen trees lining the outfield fence.  Its seating areas include a main grandstand behind home plate, bleachers down the first base line, and a viewing deck down the third base line.  It also has a press box, restrooms, and concessions.

Other Uses 
2021 will see the debut of the Expedition League at Kraft Field, as the Wheat City Whiskey Jacks from Brandon, Manitoba will be relocated due to the border closure.

In addition to North Dakota baseball, the field has hosted the 2011 Great West Conference baseball tournament and the 1992 and 2004 North Central Conference Baseball Tournament.  The baseball teams of Red River High School, next to whose campus the field is located, and Grand Forks Central High School also uses the field.

See also 
 List of NCAA Division I baseball venues

References 

College baseball venues in the United States
Sports venues in North Dakota
North Dakota Fighting Hawks baseball
Baseball venues in North Dakota
2011 establishments in North Dakota
Sports venues completed in 2011
High school baseball venues in the United States